Zsolt Limperger (born 13 September 1968) is a Hungarian former footballer who played at both professional and international levels as a central defender. Active in both Hungary and Spain, Limperger made over 200 career appearances.

Career
Born in Pápa, Limperger played club football in both Hungary and Spain for Ferencváros, Real Burgos, Celta Vigo and Real Mallorca.

Limperger earned 22 caps for Hungary between 1989 and 1992, appearing in four FIFA World Cup qualifying matches. He scored once at senior international level, against the United States in 1990. He also made three appearances at the 1985 FIFA U-16 World Championship.

References

1968 births
Living people
Hungarian footballers
Nemzeti Bajnokság I players
La Liga players
Segunda División players
Ferencvárosi TC footballers
Real Burgos CF footballers
RC Celta de Vigo players
RCD Mallorca players
Hungary international footballers
Hungary youth international footballers
Hungarian expatriate footballers
Expatriate footballers in Spain
Association football defenders
People from Pápa
Sportspeople from Veszprém County